Samantha Stosur successfully defended her title, defeating Zarina Diyas in the final, 7–6(9–7), 6–3.

Seeds

Draw

Finals

Top half

Bottom half

Qualifying

Seeds

Qualifiers

Lucky loser

Draw

First qualifier

Second qualifier

Third qualifier

Fourth qualifier

References
Main Draw
Qualifying Draw

Japan Women's Open - Singles
2014 Japan Women's Open